The men's  +80 kg competition of the taekwondo events at the 2011 Pan American Games took place on the 18 of October at the CODE II Gymnasium. The defending Pan American Games champion is Gerardo Ortiz of Cuba, while the defending Pan American Championship, champion is Christopher Moitland of Costa Rica.

Schedule
All times are Central Standard Time (UTC-6).

Results

Legend
KO — Knockout
PTG — Won by Points Gap
SUP — Won by Superiority
OT — Won on over time (Golden Point)

Main bracket

References

Taekwondo at the 2011 Pan American Games